Darya Reznichenko (born 3 April 1991) is an Uzbekistani Olympic long jumper.

In June 2021 in Bishkek (Kyrgyzstan) at the international competition for the prizes of the Olympic champion - Tatyana Kolpakova, she showed a result of 6.83 m, thus she managed to fulfill the standard of the Summer Olympic Games 2020 (6.82 m).

She took part in the Athletics at the 2020 Summer Olympics – Women's long jump.

Doping
She received a four-year suspension from December 2015 after testing positive for testosterone and oxandrolone in an out of competition test in Spała, Poland.

References

External links
 

1991 births
Living people
Uzbekistani female long jumpers
Olympic athletes of Uzbekistan
Athletes (track and field) at the 2020 Summer Olympics
Doping cases in athletics
Sportspeople from Tashkent